Urbandale High School (UHS) is a public high school in Urbandale, Iowa. It is the only high school in the Urbandale Community School District.

History 
Until 1937, students wishing to pursue a high school education traveled to other cities, as Urbandale did not have high school facilities. The first year of high school education in Urbandale was the 1936–1937 school year. A gymnasium with a stage was completed in 1940 with Works Progress Administration funding. A new building was finished in 1963, with additions in 1978 and 1981. Another new building opened in 2007.

Athletics
The J-Hawks are members of the Central Iowa Metro League, and participate in the following sports:
Fall
 Football
 1975 Class 3A State Champions
 Volleyball
 Cross Country
 Boys' 2-time Class AA State Champions (1968, 1970)
 Boys' golf
 Girls' swimming
Winter 
 Basketball
 Bowling
 Wrestling
 1996 Class 3A State Champions 
 1996 Class 3A State Duals Champions 
 Boys' swimming
 Spring —
 Track and field
 Soccer
 Boys' 2-time Class 2A State Champions (1998, 2002)
 Girls' 2001 State Champions
 Tennis
 Boys' 1997 Class 2A State Champions
 Girls' 2002 Class 2A State Champions
 Girls' golf
 Summer 
 Baseball
 4-time Class 4A State Champions (2000, 2007, 2018, 2019) 
 Softball
 3-time State Champions (1976, 1977, 1986)

Performing arts
UHS has two competitive show choirs, the mixed-gender "Studio" and "Vitality". The program has been hosting an annual competition since 1983.

Notable alumni
Eddie Berlin, football player
Allen Lazard, football player

Tyler Trepp, Recording Artist with Straight No Chaser
|url=https://www.sncmusic.com|

See also
List of high schools in Iowa

References

External links
 Official site
 www.j-hawks.com
 Complete history of the Urbandale School District

Public high schools in Iowa
Schools in Polk County, Iowa
Urbandale, Iowa
Iowa High School Athletic Association
Educational institutions established in 1936
1936 establishments in Iowa